The Bala Bodhisattva is an ancient Indian statue of a Bodhisattva, found in 1904-1905 by German archaeologist F.O. Oertel (1862-1942) in Sarnath, India. The statue has been decisive in matching the reign of Kanishka with contemporary sculptural style, especially the type of similar sculptures from Mathura, as its bears a dated inscription in his name. This statue is in all probability a product of the art of Mathura, which was then transported to the Ganges region.

Inscription
The inscription on the Bodhisattva explains that it was dedicated by a "Brother" (Bhikshu) named Bala,  in the "Year 3 of Kanishka". This allows to be a rather precise date on the sculptural style represented by the statue, as year 3 is thought to be approximately 123 CE.

The inscription further states that Kanishka (who ruled from his capital in Mathura) had several satraps under his commands in order to rule his vast territory: the names of the Indo-Scythian Northern Satraps  Mahakshatrapa ("Great Satrap") Kharapallana and the Kshatrapa ("Satrap") Vanaspara are mentioned as satraps for the eastern territories of Kanishka's empire.

Inscription on the octagonal shaft
There are altogether three inscriptions, the largest one being the inscription on the octagonal shaft of the umbrella. The octagonal shaft and its umbrella are visible in "Avatāraṇa: a Note on the Bodhisattva Image Dated in the Third Year of Kaniṣka in the Sārnāth Museum" by
Giovanni Verardi.

Original text:
1.  
2.  
3.  
4.  
5.  
6.  
7.  
8.  
9.  
10. 

Translation:
1. In the year 3 of the Great King Kaniska, [month] 3 of winter, day 22: 
2–3. on this aforementioned [date], [as the gift] of the Monk Bala, Tripitaka Master 
and companion of the Monk Pusyavuddhi [= Pusyavrddhi or Pusyabuddhi?], 
4. this Bodhisattva and umbrella-and-staff was established 
5. in Varanasi, at the Lord's promenade, together with [Bala's] mother 
6. and father, with his teachers and masters, his companions 
7. and students, with the Tripitaka Master Buddhamitra, 
8. with the Ksatrapa Vanaspara and Kharapallana, 
9. and with the four communities, 
10. for the welfare and happiness of all beings.

Inscriptions on the base of the statue
There are also two smaller inscriptions of similar content at the base of the statue:

At the front of the base of the statue:
"The gift of Friar Bala, a master of the Tripitaka, (namely an image of) the Bodhisattva, has been erected by the great satrap Kharapallana together with the satrap Vanashpara."

At the back of the base of the statue:
"In the 3rd year of the Maharaja Kanishka, the 3rd (month) of winter, the 23rd day, on this (date specified as) above has (this gift) of Friar Bala,  a master of the Tripitaka, (namely an image of) the Bodhisattva and an umbrella with a post, been erected."

Style
The style of this statue is somewhat reminiscent of the earlier monumental Yaksha statues, usually dated to a few centuries earlier. On the other hand, despite other known instances of Hellenistic influence on Indian art, very little if any such influence can be seen in this type of statue. Thus, they are quite different from the Greco-Buddhist art of Gandhara. This statue is in all probability a product of the art of Mathura, which was then transported to the Ganges region.

The discovery was published in the "Archaeological Survey of India Annual Report for the Year 1904–1905", in an article by F.O. Oertel pp. 59–104.

The statue is now in the Sarnath Museum.

Gallery

References

Sources
 Avatāraṇa: a Note on the Bodhisattva Image Dated in the Third Year of Kaniṣka in the Sārnāth Museum, by Giovanni Verardi, East and West, Vol. 35, No. 1/3 (September 1985), pp. 67–101 JSTOR

See also

 Indian art
 Mathura art

Bodhisattvas
Indian Buddhist sculpture
Mathura art
Sarnath
Statues in India